The African Minifootball Confederation, also referred to by its abbreviation, AMC & previously known as AMF (African Minifootball Federation), is the administrative body for 5-a-side version of minifootball in Africa. It is one of five continental confederations of world football's governing body, the World Minifootball Federation.

History
The AMC's assembly was held in December 2016 in Tunis, Tunisia. The body was created and a new president, Achraf Ben Salha (the 1st president of the Tunisian Minifootball Federation & the vice president of WMF), was elected. It also elected Somali Abdelkader Mohamed as first vice-president, and Libyan Houcine Touileb as second vice-president.

Competitions

African Minifootball Cup
African Minifootball Champions League

Major tournament records

 
 
 
 
 
 
 — Host(s)

WMF World Cup

WMF Continental Cup

WMF Women’s World Cup

U23 WMF World Cup

References

External links
WMF continental members - minifootball.com
https://africanminifootball.org- AMC's Official Website 

Minifootball
Sports governing bodies in Africa
Sports organizations established in 2016
2016 establishments in Africa